Abdulmajeed Abdullah Al-Ruwaili  (born 28 August 1986) is a retired Saudi Arabian professional footballer who played as a midfielder.

Club career

Al-Taawoun
In 2015, Abdulmajeed went to Al-Taawoun from Al-Shabab. He made a record in Saudi League for the most Saudi player that scores from penalties which were four and still counting. He scored 13 goals from midfield, at that season he was the most Saudi player to score goals.

Al-Hilal
On 29 June 2016, Al-Hilal signed Al-Ruwaili with a two-year contract. He scored his first goal against Al-Qadisiyah. In that season he won the league and the Kings Cup.

Al-Fayha
On 9 June 2017, Al-Fayha signed Abdulmajeed with a two-year contract.

Statistics 
As of 3 June 2017

International goals
Scores and results list Saudi Arabia's goal tally first.

Honours

Al-Shabab
Kings Cup (1): 2014

Al-Hilal
Saudi Professional League (1): 2016–17
Kings Cup (1): 2017

References

External links
 

1986 births
Living people
Saudi Arabian footballers
Saudi Arabia international footballers
Al-Orobah FC players
Al-Raed FC players
Al-Shabab FC (Riyadh) players
Al-Taawoun FC players
Al Hilal SFC players
Al-Fayha FC players
Saudi First Division League players
Saudi Professional League players
Saudi Second Division players
Association football midfielders